Lake Morton-Berrydale is a census-designated place (CDP) in King County, Washington, United States. The population was 10,474 at the 2020 census.

Based on per capita income, one of the more reliable measures of affluence, Lake Morton-Berrydale ranks 44th of 522 areas in the state of Washington to be ranked.

Geography
Lake Morton-Berrydale is located in southwestern King County at  (47.331709, -122.103370). It is bordered to the west by the city of Auburn, to the northwest by Kent, to the north by Covington, to the northeast by Maple Valley, to the east by Black Diamond, and to the south by the Lake Holm CDP. The southern border of the Lake Morton-Berrydale CDP follows Covington Creek and Big Soos Creek, which flows west to the Green River. The namesake water body of Lake Morton is in the eastern part of the CDP, and the unincorporated community of Berrydale is in the northwest.

Washington State Route 18 forms the northwest border of the CDP, and leads northeast  to Interstate 90 near Snoqualmie and southwest  to Auburn.

Demographics

As of the census of 2000, there were 9,659 people, 3,245 households, and 2,735 families residing in the CDP. The population density was 773.6 people per square mile (298.6/km2). There were 3,312 housing units at an average density of 265.3/sq mi (102.4/km2). The racial makeup of the CDP was 92.50% White, 0.86% African American, 0.80% Native American, 2.09% Asian, 0.19% Pacific Islander, 1.09% from other races, and 2.47% from two or more races. Hispanic or Latino of any race were 2.31% of the population.

There were 3,245 households, out of which 43.3% had children under the age of 18 living with them, 74.5% were married couples living together, 6.3% had a female householder with no husband present, and 15.7% were non-families. 11.6% of all households were made up of individuals, and 2.6% had someone living alone who was 65 years of age or older. The average household size was 2.98 and the average family size was 3.21.

In the CDP the population was spread out, with 29.1% under the age of 18, 6.4% from 18 to 24, 29.1% from 25 to 44, 28.7% from 45 to 64, and 6.6% who were 65 years of age or older. The median age was 38 years. For every 100 females there were 105.5 males. For every 100 females age 18 and over, there were 103.9 males.

The median income for a household in the CDP was $75,337, and the median income for a family was $80,516. Males had a median income of $54,151 versus $36,101 for females. The per capita income for the CDP was $28,980. About 0.5% of families and 1.7% of the population were below the poverty line, including none of those under age 18 and 3.6% of those age 65 or over.

References

Census-designated places in King County, Washington